Mark Schreiber may refer to:
 Mark Schreiber (writer), American writer
 Mark Schreiber, Baron Marlesford, British Conservative politician. 
 Mark Schreiber (American politician), member of the Kansas House of Representatives